The 2007 Chicago Cubs season was the 136th season of the Chicago Cubs franchise, the 132nd in the National League and the 92nd at Wrigley Field. The Cubs, trying to rebound after a season in which they finished last in their division for the first time since 2000, finished first in the National League Central with a record of 85–77. They were swept three games to none by the Arizona Diamondbacks in the 2007 National League Division Series.

Offseason
In an attempt to rebuild the team, the Cubs were very aggressive in the free-agent market, signing a number of players with the goal of overtaking the World Champion St. Louis Cardinals in a competitive NL Central to win the World Series for the first time since 1908.

The first change was the signing of a new manager. On October 17, 2006, Lou Piniella signed a three-year deal with an option for a fourth season to manage the Cubs — the 50th manager in team history after Dusty Baker was not offered an extension of his contract following the 2006 season.

On November 14, 2006, the Cubs improved their depth by signing Mark DeRosa to a three-year, $13 million contract. DeRosa had played several positions for the Texas Rangers and Atlanta Braves earlier in his career. Two days later on November 16, Neal Cotts was traded by the Chicago White Sox to the Chicago Cubs for David Aardsma and Carlos Vásquez (minors).

The Cubs made the largest acquisition in their team's history on November 20, 2006, as Alfonso Soriano agreed to an eight-year contract worth $136 million, an average of $17 million per year.

On December 7, Josh Hamilton was drafted by the Chicago Cubs from the Tampa Bay Devil Rays in the 2006 rule 5 draft. Several hours later, Hamilton was purchased by the Cincinnati Reds from the Chicago Cubs.

The Cubs added two starting pitchers to the rotation, starting with the signing of Ted Lilly on December 15, 2006, to a four-year, $40 million deal. This was followed on December 19, 2006, with the signing of Jason Marquis to a three-year contract worth $21 million.

Regular season

Season summary
The Cubs got off to a poor start after the first two months of the season, posting a 22–29 record going into a home series against the Atlanta Braves during the first weekend after Memorial Day. Derrek Lee led a players only meeting on May 30 attempting to turn around the team's poor performance. On the Friday start at Wrigley, Carlos Zambrano took the mound and the Cubs fell behind 7–1, including allowing five runs (four earned) in the fifth inning. Included in the inning was a passed ball and throwing error by catcher Michael Barrett. An altercation ensued between the pitcher and catcher in the dugout, in full view of the television camera crews. Zambrano was pulled from the game after the scuffle in which he gave up thirteen hits and had zero strikeouts, and Barrett was replaced by backup Koyie Hill.

On Saturday, the weekend series continued to be interesting, albeit outside of the boxscore. The Braves took an early 3–0 lead in the fourth inning against starting pitcher Rich Hill, but the Cubs clawed back with single runs in the fifth, sixth, and seventh innings, tying the game 3–3. The Braves regained the lead in the eighth against reliever Will Ohman, but in the bottom of the frame, rookie Ángel Pagán led off by lining a ball into the right-field corner, and stopped at second with a double. Two pitches later, Pagán attempted to advance to third on a wild pitch, but was thrown out on a close play. Both Piniella and third-base coach Mike Quade argued the call with umpire Mark Wegner, and Piniella began kicking dirt, throwing and kicking his cap until being thrown out of the game. Allegedly, Piniella kicked umpire Wegner, and was reported to the MLB offices by crew chief Bruce Froemming. Play was delayed for seven minutes while the grounds crew cleaned up debris in the outfield. The Cubs lost the game 5–3, worsening their record to a season-low nine games below .500 at 22–31. Piniella was suspended for four games for the incident, and later recognized that Wegner made the right call.

Two weeks later, Barrett was recorded having a heated discussion with starter Rich Hill. Questions quickly surfaced to the level of friction between the two players due to the recent incident with Zambrano, but both players indicated that there was no issue, rather frustration due to the opposing pitcher Jarrod Washburn hitting a hanging slider that put the Mariners up 3–2. The Cubs ultimately lost the game 5–3 in extra innings on another contentious play where Barrett dropped the ball on a throw to the plate. After the altercations with Zambrano and Hill, Barrett lost his role as the everyday catcher for the team. Just one week later, Barrett was traded to the San Diego Padres for catcher Rob Bowen

The Cubs improved their play during the month of June, upping their record to 38–39 after a stretch of 16–8 after the Piniella ejection. They finished June with a key series at home against the first-place Milwaukee Brewers starting on June 29. Rich Hill once again took the mound, but gave up five runs in the first inning and lasted just three innings. The Cubs relievers kept the game close, but they still trailed 5–3 going into the bottom of the ninth against Francisco Cordero. Going into the game, Cordero led the league with 27 saves, and had blown only two. After retiring the first player in the inning, Cordero gave up back-to-back singles, and with runners at first and third allowing the potential winning run to come to the plate in the player of Derrek Lee. Lee hit a deep fly ball, but the wind knocked it down and was caught for a sacrifice fly. That made it two outs bringing third baseman Aramis Ramírez to the plate. Ramirez hit the first pitch into the left-center bleachers, winning the game 6–5. The victory pulled the Cubs back to .500, and trimmed the Brewers lead down to 6½ games. The Cubs ended the first half of the season 4.5 games out of first place, behind the Milwaukee Brewers, with a record of 44 wins and 43 losses.

The Chicago Cubs got off to a good start in the second half by sweeping the Houston Astros at home and taking three of four from the San Francisco Giants. In those series Ted Lilly won his third and fourth starts in a row, helping pitch the Cubs to 9–3 and 9–8 victories. On July 22, the Cubs passed the two-million attendance mark at Wrigley Field averaging over 40,000 fans per game at home through the first 49 games of the season and on pace to set a new home attendance record for the club. The Cubs spent a majority of July in hopes of claiming first place. After finishing the month with seventeen wins and nine losses, the team was merely half a game behind the Brewers by July 31. The Cubs won their final game in July and first game in August. The latter win, coupled with an earlier Brewers' loss, allowed the two teams to be tied for first place in the NL Central. However, the Cubs began to struggle in their next outings. They failed to win three consecutive series, and later temporarily lost Alfonso Soriano, Ángel Pagán, and Will Ohman to injuries. Despite the slump, the Cubs only managed to remain half a game behind the Brewers, who managed to lose thirteen of eighteen games. They closed out the final weeks of the season by having a successful home stand, where they won five of six games and took a three and a half game lead over the Brewers.

At their final home game, the Cubs' organization reported that they had set a franchise attendance record of 3,252,462 fans over the season.

During the month of June, the Cubs ended up winning seventeen games, making that their best month of the season: taking two of three from Milwaukee, two of three from the Seattle, sweeping the White Sox as well as the Rockies, and then taking another two of three games from Milwaukee. The Cubs won another seventeen games during that month; taking three of four from the Nationals, sweeping the Giants, two of three from the Cardinals, and two of three from the Phillies. During this three-month-long hot streak, the Cubs managed to sign Carlos Zambrano to a five-year, ninety million dollar contract. Also, the Cubs left fielder, Alfonso Soriano, was named the June National League player of the Month; followed by the Cubs ace, Carlos Zambrano, being named the National League Pitcher of the month. The team struggled throughout August, but managed to surpass the Milwaukee Brewers and win the division.

Going into the last week of the season, the Cubs won ten of twelve games and had a three-game lead over the Milwaukee Brewers. However, the Cubs dropped three in a row to the Florida Marlins, a team that the Cubs did not win a single game against during the whole season. Meanwhile, the Brewers lost two out of three, hurting their chance at taking over the top of the division. On September 28, thanks to a Cubs 6–0 win over the Cincinnati Reds and a Brewers 6–3 loss to the San Diego Padres, the Cubs clinched the NL Central division.

Postseason
The Cubs played the Arizona Diamondbacks in the National League Division Series. After falling 3–1 to Arizona on October 3 and an 8–4 loss on October 4, the Cubs returned on October 6 to Wrigley Field to lose the third game of the series by score of 5–1. The loss eliminated the Cubs from postseason play.

In-season trades
 On June 20, the Cubs traded catcher Michael Barrett to the San Diego Padres for catcher Rob Bowen and a minor league outfielder Kyler Burke.

 On July 16, the Cubs acquired Jason Kendall from the Oakland Athletics for fellow catcher Rob Bowen and minor league pitcher Jerry Blevins.

 On July 19, the Cubs traded César Izturis, along with a cash settlement, to the Pittsburgh Pirates.

 On August 23, the Cubs acquired Craig Monroe from the Detroit Tigers for Clay Rapada.
 On August 31, the Cubs acquired pitcher Steve Trachsel from the Baltimore Orioles for pitcher Rocky Cherry and third baseman Scott Moore.

First-year player draft
The Cubs selected high school third baseman Josh Vitters with the third overall pick of the 2007 MLB Draft.

Season standings

National League Central

Record vs. opponents

Roster

Game log

|- style="background-color:#ffbbbb"
| 1 || April 2 || @ Reds || 5–1 || Harang (1–0) || Zambrano (0–1) || || 42,720 || 0–1 ||
 |- style="background-color:#bbffbb"
| 2 || April 4 || @ Reds || 4–1 || Lilly (1–0) || Arroyo (0–1) || Dempster (1) || 25,965 || 1–1 ||
|- style="background-color:#ffbbbb"
| 3 || April 5 || @ Reds || 5–2 || Santos (1–0) || Howry (0–1) || Weathers (1) || 25,070 || 1–2 ||
|- style="background-color:#bbffbb"
| 4 || April 6 || @ Brewers || 9–3 || Hill (1–0) || Bush (0–1) || || 41,758 || 2–2 ||
|- style="background-color:#bbffbb"
| 5 || April 7 || @ Brewers || 6–3 || Zambrano (1–1) || Sheets (1–1) || Dempster (2) || 41,282 || 3–2 ||
|- style="background-color:#ffbbbb"
| 6 || April 8 || @ Brewers || 9–4 || Capuano (1–0) || Miller (0–1) || || 28,019 || 3–3 ||
|- style="background-color:#ffbbbb"
| 7 || April 9 || Astros || 5–3 || Qualls (1–1) || Howry (0–2) || Wheeler (1) || 41,388 || 3–4 ||
|- style="background-color:#ffbbbb"
| 8 || April 10 || Astros || 4–2 || Sampson (1–0) || Marquis (0–1) || || 35,924 || 3–5 ||
|- style="background-color:#bbbbbb"
| – || April 11 || Astros || colspan=7|Postponed (snow) 
|- style="background-color:#ffbbbb"
| 9 || April 13 || Reds || 6–5 || Coffey (1–0) || Zambrano (1–2) || Weathers (4) || 37,267 || 3–6 ||
|- style="background-color:#bbffbb"
| 10 || April 14 || Reds || 7–0 || Hill (2–0) || Arroyo (0–2) || || 38,598 || 4–6 ||
|- style="background-color:#ffbbbb"
| 11 || April 15 || Reds || 1–0 || Lohse (1–0) || Lilly (1–1) || Weathers (5) || 39,820 || 4–7 ||
|- style="background-color:#bbffbb"
| 12 || April 16 || Padres || 12–4 || Marquis (1–1) || Hensley (0–3) || || 32,126 || 5–7 ||
|- style="background-color:#ffbbbb"
| 13 || April 17 || Padres || 4 – 3  || Brocail (1–0) || Ohman (0–1) || Hoffman (3) || 36,021 || 5–8 ||
|- style="background-color:#ffbbbb"
| 14 || April 18 || @ Braves || 8–6 || Villarreal (1–0) || Eyre (0–1) || Wickman (5) || 26,837 || 5–9 ||
|- style="background-color:#bbffbb"
| 15 || April 19 || @ Braves || 3–0 || Hill (3–0) || Redman (0–3) || Dempster (3) || 31,603 || 6–9 ||
|- style="background-color:#ffbbbb"
| 16 || April 20 || Cardinals || 2–1 || Looper (3–1) || Lilly (1–2) || Isringhausen (4) || 38,955 || 6–10 ||
|- style="background-color:#bbffbb"
| 17 || April 21 || Cardinals || 6–0 || Marquis (2–1) || Reyes (0–3) || || 41,637 || 7–10 ||
|- style="background-color:#ffbbbb"
| 18 || April 22 || Cardinals || 12 – 9  || Isringhausen (1–0) || Dempster (0–1) || || 40,193 || 7–11 ||
|- style="background-color:#ffbbbb"
| 19 || April 23 || Brewers || 5 – 4  || Villanueva (1–0) || Cherry (0–1) || Turnbow (1) || 33,920 || 7–12 ||
|- style="background-color:#ffbbbb"
| 20 || April 24 || Brewers || 4–1 || Suppan (2–2) || Hill (3–1) || Cordero (8) || 34,382 || 7–13 ||
|- style="background-color:#bbffbb"
| 21 || April 25 || Brewers || 9–3 || Lilly (2–2) || Dessens (1–1)|| || 38,581 || 8–13 ||
|- style="background-color:#bbffbb"
| 22 || April 27 || @ Cardinals || 5–3 || Marquis (3–1) || Reyes (0–4) || Dempster (4) || 45,131 || 9–13 ||
|- style="background-color:#bbffbb"
| 23 || April 28 || @ Cardinals || 8–1 || Zambrano (2–2) || Wainwright (1–2) || || 45,015 || 10–13 ||
|- style="background-color:#bbbbbb"
| – || April 29 || @ Cardinals || colspan=7|Postponed (death of Cardinals pitcher Josh Hancock) 
|- style="background-color:#ffbbbb"
| 24 || April 30 || @ Pirates || 3–2 || Capps (2–0) || Wuertz (0–1) || Torres (8) || 11,437 || 10–14 ||
|- style=""

|- style="background-color:#bbffbb"
| 25 || May 1 || @ Pirates || 8–6 || Cherry (1–1) || Bayliss (2–2) || Dempster (5) || 13,082 || 11–14 ||
|- style="background-color:#bbffbb"
| 26 || May 2 || @ Pirates || 7–1 || Marquis (4–1) || Snell (2–2) || || 21,765 || 12–14 ||
|- style="background-color:#bbffbb"
| 27 || May 4 || Nationals || 6–4 || Zambrano (3–2) || Bergmann (0–3) || Dempster (6) || 39,444 || 13–14 ||
|- style="background-color:#bbffbb"
| 28 || May 5 || Nationals || 5–3 || Hill (4–1) || Patterson (1–5) || Dempster (7) || 40,267 || 14–14 ||
|- style="background-color:#bbffbb"
| 29 || May 6 || Nationals || 4 – 3  || Dempster (1–1) || Wagner (0–2) || || 40,481 || 15–14 ||
|- style="background-color:#ffbbbb"
| 30 || May 8 || Pirates || 4 – 3  || Bayliss (3–2) || Cotts (0–1) || Torres (10) || 39,708 || 15–15 ||
|- style="background-color:#bbffbb"
| 31 || May 9 || Pirates || 1–0 || Marquis (5–1) || Gorzelanny (4–2) || || 40,264 || 16–15 ||
|- style="background-color:#ffbbbb"
| 32 || May 10 || Pirates || 6–4 || Maholm (2–4) || Zambrano (3–3) || Torres (11) || 41,101 || 16–16 ||
|- style="background-color:#ffbbbb"
| 33 || May 11 || @ Phillies || 7–2 || Hamels (5–1) || Hill (4–2) || || 42,473 || 16–17 ||
|- style="background-color:#ffbbbb"
| 34 || May 12 || @ Phillies || 11–7 || Alfonseca (2–1) || Howry (0–3) || || 45,026 || 16–18 ||
|- style="background-color:#bbffbb"
| 35 || May 13 || @ Phillies || 4–1 || Lilly (3–2) || Lieber (1–2) || Dempster (8) || 45,129 || 17–18 ||
|- style="background-color:#ffbbbb"
| 36 || May 14 || @ Mets || 5–4 || Heilman (4–2) || Wuertz (0–2) || || 34,033 || 17–19 ||
|- style="background-color:#bbffbb"
| 37 || May 15 || @ Mets || 10–1 || Zambrano (4–3) || Maine (5–1) || || 37,487 || 18–19 ||
|- style="background-color:#ffbbbb"
| 38 || May 16 || @ Mets || 8–1 || Sosa (3–0) || Hill (4–3) || || 37,483 || 18–20 ||
|- style="background-color:#ffbbbb"
| 39 || May 17 || @ Mets || 6–5 || Burgos (1–0) || Dempster (1–2) || || 42,667 || 18–21 ||
|- style="background-color:#bbffbb"
| 40 || May 18 || White Sox || 6–3 || Lilly (4–2) || MacDougal (1–1) || Dempster (9) || 40,874 || 19–21 ||
|- style="background-color:#bbffbb"
| 41 || May 19 || White Sox || 11–6 || Howry (1–3) || Aardsma (2–1) || || 41,101 || 20–21 ||
|- style="background-color:#ffbbbb"
| 42 || May 20 || White Sox || 10–6 || Masset (2–1) || Zambrano (4–4) || || 41,164 || 20–22 ||
|- style="background-color:#ffbbbb"
| 43 || May 22 || @ Padres || 5–1 || Peavy (6–1) || Hill (4–4) || Hoffman (12) || 26,192 || 20–23 ||
|- style="background-color:#ffbbbb"
| 44 || May 23 || @ Padres || 2–1 || Wells (2–2) || Marshall (0–1) || Hoffman (11) || 27,535 || 20–24 ||
|- style="background-color:#bbffbb"
| 45 || May 24 || @ Padres || 3–1 || Howry (2–3) || Meredith (1–2) || Dempster (10) || 32,258 || 21–24 ||
|- style="background-color:#ffbbbb"
| 46 || May 25 || @ Dodgers || 9–8 || Seánez (2–0) || Ohman (0–2) || Saito (15) || 46,011 || 21–25 ||
|- style="background-color:#bbffbb"
| 47 || May 26 || @ Dodgers || 4–2 || Zambrano (5–4) || Hendrickson (2–2) || Dempster (11) || 48,243 || 22–25 ||
|- style="background-color:#ffbbbb"
| 48 || May 27 || @ Dodgers || 2 – 1  || Billingsley (3–0) || Guzmán (0–1) || || 51,198 || 22–26 ||
|- style="background-color:#ffbbbb"
| 49 || May 28 || Marlins || 5–3 || Kim (3–2) || Marshall (0–2) || Gregg (5) || 41,630 || 22–27 ||
|- style="background-color:#ffbbbb"
| 50 || May 29 || Marlins || 9–4 || Willis (7–3) || Marquis (5–2) || Gregg (6) || 39,788 || 22–28 ||
|- style="background-color:#ffbbbb"
| 51 || May 30 || Marlins || 9–0 || Messenger (1–1) || Lilly (4–3) || || 36,699 || 22–29 ||

|- style="background-color:#ffbbbb"
| 52 || June 1 || Braves || 8–5 || Davies (1–1) || Zambrano (5–5) || || 39,523 || 22–30 ||
|- style="background-color:#ffbbbb"
| 53 || June 2 || Braves || 5–3 || Yates (2–0) || Ohman (0–3) || Wickman (9) || 40,290 || 22–31 ||
|- style="background-color:#bbffbb"
| 54 || June 3 || Braves || 10–1 || Marshall (1–2) || Cormier (0–1) || || 40,155 || 23–31 ||
|- style="background-color:#bbffbb"
| 55 || June 4 || @ Brewers || 7–2 || Mármol (1–0) || Bush (3–6) || || 35,760 || 24–31 ||
|- style="background-color:#ffbbbb"
| 56 || June 5 || @ Brewers || 7–5 || Vargas (4–1) || Lilly (4–4) || Cordero (22) || 38,535 || 24–32 ||
|- style="background-color:#bbffbb"
| 57 || June 6 || @ Brewers || 6–2 || Zambrano (6–5) || Suppan (7–6) || || 40,186 || 25–32 ||
|- style="background-color:#bbffbb"
| 58 || June 7 || @ Braves || 2–1 || Hill (5–4) || James (5–5) || Dempster (12) || 32,902 || 26–32 ||
|- style="background-color:#bbffbb"
| 59 || June 8 || @ Braves || 9–1 || Marshall (2–2) || Cormier (0–2) || || 37,123 || 27–32 ||
|- style="background-color:#ffbbbb"
| 60 || June 9 || @ Braves || 9–5 || Moylan (2–1) || Marquis (5–3) || || 51,816 || 27–33 ||
|- style="background-color:#ffbbbb"
| 61 || June 10 || @ Braves || 5–4 || Paronto (3–1) || Dempster (1–3) || Wickman (11) || 32,752 || 27–34 ||
|- style="background-color:#bbffbb"
| 62 || June 11 || Astros || 2–1 || Zambrano (7–5) || Williams (2–9) || Dempster (13) || 37,947 || 28–34 ||
|- style="background-color:#ffbbbb"
| 63 || June 12 || Mariners || 5 – 3  || O'Flaherty (3–0) || Ohman (0–4) || Putz (18) || 40,071 || 28–35 ||
|- style="background-color:#bbffbb"
| 64 || June 13 || Mariners || 3–2 || Marshall (3–2) || Batista (7–5) || Dempster (14) || 40,163 || 29–35 ||
|- style="background-color:#bbffbb"
| 65 || June 14 || Mariners || 5–4 || Howry (3–3) || Morrow (3–1) || || 39,846 || 30–35 ||
|- style="background-color:#bbffbb"
| 66 || June 15 || Padres || 4–1 || Lilly (5–4) || Wells (3–4) || Dempster (15) || 40,479 || 31–35 ||
|- style="background-color:#ffbbbb"
| 67 || June 16 || Padres || 1–0 || Bell (1–2) || Zambrano (7–6) || Hoffman (19) || 41,632 || 31–36 ||
|- style="background-color:#ffbbbb"
| 68 || June 17 || Padres || 11–3 || Maddux (6–3) || Hill (5–5) || || 40,964 || 31–37 ||
|- style="background-color:#bbffbb"
| 69 || June 19 || @ Rangers || 5–4 || Mármol (2–0) || Benoit (2–2) || Dempster (16)|| 38,290 || 32–37 ||
|- style="background-color:#ffbbbb"
| 70 || June 20 || @ Rangers || 7–3 || Loe (3–6) || Marquis (5–4) || || 37,564 || 32–38 ||
|- style="background-color:#ffbbbb"
| 71 || June 21 || @ Rangers || 6–5 || Gagné (2–0) || Howry (3–4) || || 38,406 || 32–39 ||
|- style="background-color:#bbffbb"
| 72 || June 22 || @ White Sox || 5–1 || Zambrano (8–6) || Buehrle (4–4) || || 39,046 || 33–39 ||
|- style="background-color:#bbffbb"
| 73 || June 23 || @ White Sox || 2–1 || Wuertz (1–2) || Jenks (2–3) || Howry (1) || 39,043 || 34–39 ||
|- style="background-color:#bbffbb"
| 74 || June 24 || @ White Sox || 3–0 || Marshall (4–2) || Contreras (5–8) || Howry (2) || 39,194 || 35–39 ||
|- style="background-color:#bbffbb"
| 75 || June 25 || Rockies || 10–9 || Howry (4–4) || Fuentes (0–2) || || 40,269 || 36–39 ||
|- style="background-color:#bbffbb"
| 76 || June 26 || Rockies || 8–5 || Lilly (6–4) || López (4–1) || Ohman (1) || 40,121 || 37–39 ||
|- style="background-color:#bbffbb"
| 77 || June 27 || Rockies || 6–4 || Zambrano (9–6) || Hirsh (3–7) || Mármol (1) || 39,972 || 38–39 ||
|- style="background-color:#bbffbb"
| 78 || June 29 || Brewers || 6–5 || Howry (5–4) || Cordero (0–2) || || 41,909 || 39–39 ||
|- style="background-color:#ffbbbb"
| 79 || June 30 || Brewers || 13–4 || Sheets (10–3) || Marshall (4–3) || || 41,415 || 39–40 ||

|- style="background-color:#bbffbb"
| 80 || July 1 || Brewers || 5–1 || Marquis (6–4) || Bush (6–7) || || 41,486 || 40–40 ||
|- style="background-color:#bbffbb"
| 81 || July 2 || @ Nationals || 7–2 || Lilly (7–4) || Simontacchi (5–6) || || 24,015 || 41–40 ||
|- style="background-color:#bbffbb"
| 82 || July 3 || @ Nationals || 3–1 || Zambrano (10–6) || Redding (0–1) || Howry (3) || 30,106 || 42–40 ||
|- style="background-color:#ffbbbb"
| 83 || July 4 || @ Nationals || 6–0 || Chico (4–5) || Hill (5–6) || || 39,207 || 42–41 ||
|- style="background-color:#bbffbb"
| 84 || July 5 || @ Nationals || 4–2 || Ohman (1–4) || Ayala (0–1) || Howry (4) || 22,594 || 43–41 ||
|- style="background-color:#ffbbbb"
| 85 || July 6 || @ Pirates || 8–4 || Maholm (5–11) || Marquis (6–5) || || 27,868 || 43–42 ||
|- style="background-color:#bbffbb"
| 86 || July 7 || @ Pirates || 7–1 || Lilly (8–4) ||  (0–3) || || 33,293 || 44–42 ||
|- style="background-color:#ffbbbb"
| 87 || July 8 || @ Pirates || 6–2 || Youman (2–0) || Zambrano (10–7) || || 22,470 || 44–43 ||
|- style=" background:#bbb;"
|colspan=10| All–Star Break (July 9–12)
|- style="background-color:#bbffbb"
| 88 || July 13 || Astros || 6–0 || Zambrano (11–7) || Jennings (1–5) || || 41,593 || 45–43 ||
|- style="background-color:#bbffbb"
| 89 || July 14 || Astros || 9–3 || Lilly (9–4) || Oswalt (8–6) || || 41,448 || 46–43 ||
|- style="background-color:#bbffbb"
| 90 || July 15 || Astros || 7–6 || Wuertz (2–2) || Rodríguez (6–8) || Howry (5) || 41,757 || 47–43 ||
|- style="background-color:#bbffbb"
| 91 || July 16 || Giants || 3–2 || Hill (6–6) || Correia (1–5) || Howry (6) || 40,282 || 48–43 ||
|- style="background-color:#ffbbbb"
| 92 || July 17 || Giants || 4–2 || Zito (7–9) || Mármol (2–1) || Hennessey (6) || 41,102 || 48–44 ||
|- style="background-color:#bbffbb"
| 93 || July 18 || Giants || 12–1 || Zambrano (12–7) || Cain (3–11) || Gallagher (1) || 39,792 || 49–44 ||
|- style="background-color:#bbffbb"
| 94 || July 19 || Giants || 9–8 || Lilly (10–4) || Morris (7–6) || Howry (7) || 40,198 || 50–44 ||
|- style="background-color:#bbffbb"
| 95 || July 20 || D-backs || 6–2 || Marquis (7–5) || Webb (8–8) || || 41,071 || 51–44 ||
|- style="background-color:#ffbbbb"
| 96 || July 21 || D-backs || 3–2 || Cruz (4–1) || Howry (5–5) || Valverde (29) || 41,632 || 51–45 ||
|- style="background-color:#ffbbbb"
| 97 || July 22 || D-backs || 3–0 || Petit (2–2) || Marshall (4–4) || Valverde (30) || 41,705 || 51–46 ||
|- style="background-color:#bbffbb"
| 98 || July 24 || @ Cardinals || 4–3 || Zambrano (13–7) || Wells (4–13) || Dempster (17) || 45,436 || 52–46 ||
|- style="background-color:#bbffbb"
| 99 || July 25 || @ Cardinals || 7–1 || Lilly (11–4) || Wainwright (9–8) || || 45,316 || 53–46 ||
|- style="background-color:#ffbbbb"
| 100 || July 26 || @ Cardinals || 11–1 || Looper (8–8) || Marquis (7–6) || || 45,308 || 53–47 ||
|- style="background-color:#ffbbbb"
| 101 || July 27 || @ Reds || 5–4 || Weathers (2–3) || Howry (5–6) || || 36,635 || 53–48 ||
|- style="background-color:#bbffbb"
| 102 || July 28 || @ Reds || 8–1 || Marshall (5–4) || Harang (10–3) || || 42,365 || 54–48 ||
|- style="background-color:#bbffbb"
| 103 || July 29 || @ Reds || 6–0 || Zambrano (14–7) || Belisle (5–8) || || 33,061 || 55–48 ||
|- style="background-color:#ffbbbb"
| 104 || July 30|| Phillies || 4–1 || Hamels (12–5) || Lilly (11–5) || Myers (7) || 41,686 || 55–49 ||
|- style="background-color:#bbffbb"
| 105 || July 31|| Phillies || 7–3 || Marquis (8–6) || Eaton (9–7) || || 40,495 || 56–49 ||

|- style="background-color:#bbffbb"
| 106 || August 1|| Phillies || 5–4 || Dempster (2–3) || Myers (1–3) || || 40,558 || 57–49 ||
|- style="background-color:#ffbbbb"
| 107 || August 2|| Phillies || 10–6 || Durbin (4–2) || Marshall (5–5) || || 40,988 || 57–50 ||
|- style="background-color:#ffbbbb"
| 108 || August 3|| Mets || 6–2 || Mota (1–0) || Dempster (2–4) || || 41,512 || 57–51 ||
|- style="background-color:#bbffbb"
| 109 || August 4|| Mets || 6–2 || Lilly (12–5) || Maine (12–6) || || 41,412 || 58–51 ||
|- style="background-color:#ffbbbb"
| 110 || August 5|| Mets || 8–3 || Glavine (10–6) || Marquis (8–7) || || 41,599 || 58–52 ||
|- style="background-color:#ffbbbb"
| 111 || August 6 || @ Astros || 2 – 1  || Lidge (3–1) || Wuertz (2–3) || || 36,459 || 58–53 ||
|- style="background-color:#ffbbbb"
| 112 || August 7 || @ Astros || 5–2 || Williams (6–12) || Marshall (5–6) || Lidge (7) || 37,561 || 58–54 ||
|- style="background-color:#ffbbbb"
| 113 || August 8 || @ Astros || 8–2 || Oswalt (12–6) || Zambrano (14–8) || || 41,655 || 58–55 ||
|- style="background-color:#bbffbb"
| 114 || August 9 || @ Rockies || 10–2 || Lilly (13–5) || Jiménez (1–2) || || 40,738 || 59–55 ||
|- style="background-color:#bbffbb"
| 115 || August 10 || @ Rockies || 6–2 || Marquis (9–7) || Cook (8–7) || || 41,282 || 60–55 ||
|- style="background-color:#ffbbbb"
| 116 || August 11 || @ Rockies || 15–2 || Fogg (7–7) || Hill (6–7) || || 48,095 || 60–56 ||
|- style="background-color:#ffbbbb"
| 117 || August 12|| @ Rockies || 6–3 || Herges (1–0) || Wood (0–1) || Corpas (9) || 39,176 || 60–57 ||
|- style="background-color:#ffbbbb"
| 118 || August 14|| Reds || 6–5 || Harang (12–3) || Zambrano (14–9) || Weathers (23) || 40,750 || 60–58 ||
|- style="background-color:#ffbbbb"
| 119 || August 15|| Reds || 11–9 || Bray (1–0) || Howry (5–7) || Weathers (24) || 40,162 || 60–59 ||
|- style="background-color:#bbffbb"
| 120 || August 16|| Reds || 12–4 || Marquis (10–7) || Livingston (3–3) || || 40,372 || 61–59 ||
|- style="background-color:#bbffbb"
| 121 || August 17|| Cardinals || 2–1 || Hill (7–7)|| Looper (10–10) || Dempster (18) || 41,634 || 62–59 ||
|- style="background-color:#bbffbb"
| 122 || August 18|| Cardinals || 5–3 || Marshall (6–6) || Reyes (2–12) || Dempster (19) || 41,369 || 63–59 ||
|- style="background-color:#bbbbbb"
| – || August 19 || Cardinals || colspan=7|Postponed (rain) 
|- style="background-color:#ffbbbb"
| 123 || August 20 || Cardinals || 6–4 || Piñeiro (4–2) || Lilly (13–6) || Isringhausen (23) || 40,141 || 63–60 ||
|- style="background-color:#bbffbb"
| 124 || August 21 || @ Giants || 5–1 || Eyre (1–1) || Lincecum (7–4) || || 41,242 || 64–60 ||
|- style="background-color:#bbffbb"
| 125 || August 22 || @ Giants || 4–2 || Mármol (3–1) || Misch (0–3) || Dempster (20) || 39,548 || 65–60 ||
|- style="background-color:#ffbbbb"
| 126 || August 23 || @ Giants || 4–1 || Cain (6–13) || Zambrano (14–10) || Hennessey (13) || 41,558 || 65–61 ||
|- style="background-color:#bbffbb"
| 127 || August 24 || @ D-backs || 6–2 || Marshall (7–6)|| Owings (6–7) || Dempster (21) || 36,700 || 66–61 ||
|- style="background-color:#ffbbbb"
| 128 || August 25 || @ D-backs || 3–1 || Davis (11–11) || Lilly (13–7) || Valverde (39) || 46,173 || 66–62 ||
|- style="background-color:#ffbbbb"
| 129 || August 26 || @ D-backs || 5–4 || González (6–2) || Marquis (10–8) || Valverde (40) || 38,902 || 66–63 ||
|- style="background-color:#bbffbb"
| 130 || August 28 || Brewers || 5–3 || Hill (8–7) || Linebrink (4–6) || Dempster (22) || 40,884 || 67–63 ||
|- style="background-color:#ffbbbb"
| 131 || August 29 || Brewers || 6–1 || Sheets (11–4) || Zambrano (14–11) || || 40,512 || 67–64 ||
|- style="background-color:#bbffbb"
| 132 || August 30 || Brewers || 5–4 || Mármol (4–1) || Capuano (5–12) || Dempster (23) || 40,790 || 68–64 ||
|- style="background-color:#ffbbbb"
| 133 || August 31 || Astros || 6–1 || Rodríguez (8–12) || Marshall (7–7) || || 41,297 || 68–65 ||

|- style="background-color:#bbffbb"
| 134 || September 1 || Astros || 4–3 || Marquis (11–8) || Patton (0–2) || Dempster (24) || 40,606 || 69–65 ||
|- style="background-color:#bbffbb"
| 135 || September 2 || Astros || 6–5 || Mármol (5–1) || Qualls (6–4) || Dempster (25) || 41,415 || 70–65 ||
|- style="background-color:#ffbbbb"
| 136 || September 3 || Dodgers || 11–3 || Loaiza (2–0) || Zambrano (14–12) || || 41,070 || 70–66 ||
|- style="background-color:#ffbbbb"
| 137 || September 4 || Dodgers || 6–2 || Penny (15–4) || Trachsel (6–9) || || 37,834 || 70–67 ||
|- style="background-color:#bbffbb"
| 138 || September 5 || Dodgers || 8–2 || Lilly (14–7) || Stults (1–3) || || 39,559 || 71–67 ||
|- style="background-color:#ffbbbb"
| 139 || September 6 || Dodgers || 7–4 || Beimel (4–1) || Dempster (2–5) || Saito (37) || 39,397 || 71–68 ||
|- style="background-color:#ffbbbb"
| 140 || September 7 || @ Pirates || 6–1 || Gorzelanny (14–7) || Hill (8–8) || || 24,489 || 71–69 ||
|- style="background-color:#bbffbb"
| 141 || September 8 || @ Pirates || 5–1 || Zambrano (15–12) || Snell (9–12) || || 33,373 || 72–69 ||
|- style="background-color:#ffbbbb"
| 142 || September 9|| @ Pirates || 10–5 || Morris (9–9) || Trachsel (6–10) || || 21,861 || 72–70 ||
|- style="background-color:#bbffbb"
| 143 || September 10|| Cardinals || 12–3 || Lilly (15–7) || Piñeiro (5–4) || || 40,358 || 73–70 ||
|- style="background-color:#ffbbbb"
| 144 || September 11|| @ Astros || 5 – 4  || Lidge (4–2) || Dempster (2–6) || || 33,493 || 73–71 ||
|- style="background-color:#bbffbb"
| 145 || September 12|| @ Astros || 3–2 || Hill (9–8) || Albers (4–8) || Dempster (26) || 33,115 || 74–71 ||
|- style="background-color:#bbffbb"
| 146 || September 13|| @ Astros || 6–2 || Trachsel (7–10) || Williams (8–15) || || 34,234 || 75–71 ||
|- style="background-color:#bbffbb"
| 147 || September 14|| @ Cardinals || 5–3 || Zambrano (16–12) || Wainwright (13–11) || Howry (8) || 45,750 || 76–71 ||
|- style="background-color:#bbffbb"
| 148 || September 15|| @ Cardinals || 3–2 || Wood (1–1) || Franklin (4–4) || Dempster (27) || 45,918 || 77–71 ||
|- style="background-color:#ffbbbb"
| 149 || September 15|| @ Cardinals || 4–3 || Piñeiro (6–4) || Marshall (7–8) || Isringhausen (29) || 45,894 || 77–72 ||
|- style="background-color:#bbffbb"
| 150 || September 16 || @ Cardinals || 4–2 || Marquis (12–8) || Mulder (0–3) || Dempster (28) || 45,735 || 78–72 ||
|- style="background-color:#bbffbb"
| 151 || September 17 || Reds || 7–6 || Ohman (2–4) || Weathers (2–6) || || 39,075 || 79–72 ||
|- style="background-color:#ffbbbb"
| 152 || September 18 || Reds || 5–2 || Harang (16–4) || Zambrano (16–13) || Weathers (31) || 40,801 || 79–73 ||
|- style="background-color:#bbffbb"
| 153 || September 19 || Reds || 3–2 || Howry (6–7) || Majewski (0–3) || || 40,805 || 80–73 ||
|- style="background-color:#bbffbb"
| 154 || September 21 || Pirates || 13–8 || Eyre (2–1) || Osoria (0–2) || || 41,591 || 81–73 ||
|- style="background-color:#bbffbb"
| 155 || September 22 || Pirates || 9–5 || Hill (10–8) || Duke (3–8) || || 41,271 || 82–73 ||
|- style="background-color:#bbffbb"
| 156 || September 23 || Pirates || 8–0 || Zambrano (17–13) || Gorzelanny (14–9) || || 41,364 || 83–73 ||
|- style="background-color:#ffbbbb"
| 157 || September 25|| @ Marlins || 4–2 || Willis (10–15) || Lilly (15–8) || Tankersley (1) || 16,044 || 83–74 ||
|- style="background-color:#ffbbbb"
| 158 || September 26|| @ Marlins || 7–4 || Kensing (2–0) || Marquis (12–9) || Gardner (2) || 19,051 || 83–75 ||
|- style="background-color:#ffbbbb"
| 159 || September 27|| @ Marlins || 6–4 || Olsen (10–15) || Trachsel (7–11) || Gregg (31) || 24,809 || 83–76 ||
|- style="background-color:#bbffbb"
| 160 || September 28|| @ Reds || 6–0 || Zambrano (18–13) || Arroyo (9–15) || || 32,193 || 84–76 ||
|- style="background-color:#bbffbb"
| 161 || September 29|| @ Reds || 4–0 || Hill (11–8) || Harang (16–6) || || 38,936 || 85–76 ||
|- style="background-color:#ffbbbb"
| 162 || September 30|| @ Reds || 8–4 || Bailey (4–2) || Dempster (2–7) || || 32,620 || 85–77 ||

|- 
| Legend:       = Win       = Loss       = PostponementBold = Cubs team member

Player stats

Batting
Note: G = Games played; AB = At bats; R = Runs; H = Hits; 2B = Doubles; 3B = Triples; HR = Home runs; RBI = Runs batted in; SB = Stolen bases; BB = Walks; AVG = Batting average; SLG = Slugging average

Source:

Pitching
Note: W = Wins; L = Losses; ERA = Earned run average; G = Games pitched; GS = Games started; SV = Saves; IP = Innings pitched; H = Hits allowed; R = Runs allowed; ER = Earned runs allowed; BB = Walks allowed; SO = Strikeouts

Source:

Playoffs

NLDS vs. Arizona Diamondbacks

Farm system

References

Team Roster: Chicago Cubs Roster on ESPN.com
Batting Statistics: Chicago Cubs Stats on ESPN.com
Pitching Statistics: Chicago Cubs Pitching Stats on ESPN.com
Crosstown Classic: Cubs vs. Sox since 1997

Notes

External links

 The Official Website of the Chicago Cubs 
 Club Statistics from Baseball-Reference.com

Chicago Cubs seasons
Chicago Cubs season
National League Central champion seasons
Cub